Canarium pilosum is a tree in the family Burseraceae. The specific epithet  is from the Latin meaning "hairy", referring to the soft hairs of the twigs and leaves.

Description
The bark is smooth and pale brown.

Distribution and habitat
Canarium pilosum grows naturally in Sumatra, Peninsular Malaysia and Borneo. Its habitat is lowland to montane forest.

References

pilosum
Trees of Sumatra
Trees of Peninsular Malaysia
Trees of Borneo
Plants described in 1875
Taxa named by Alfred William Bennett